The Sanremo Music Festival 2017 was the 67th annual Sanremo Music Festival, a television song contest held at the Teatro Ariston in Sanremo, Liguria, Italy between 7 and 11 February 2017, organised and broadcast by RAI.

The show was hosted by Carlo Conti, who was also the artistic director of the competition, and Maria De Filippi. Each evening show included a satirical sketch by Maurizio Crozza.

The winner of the contest's main section was Francesco Gabbani, performing the song "Occidentali's Karma". As a result, he got the right to represent Italy at the Eurovision Song Contest 2017. Lele received first prize in the newcomers' section, with his song "Ora mai".

Format
The Sanremo Music Festival 2017  took place at the Teatro Ariston. The authors of the 67th edition were Carlo Conti, Ivana Sabatini, Leopoldo Siano, Emanuele Giovannini, Martino Clericetti, Riccardo Cassini, Mario D'Amico and Giancarlo Leone. Maurizio Pagnussat was the show's television director, while Pinuccio Pirazzoli directed the orchestra. The scenography, designed by Riccardo Bocchini for the third consecutive year, was based on the concept of popups, and it was revealed by RAI in late January.

Presenters

Television presenter Carlo Conti, who was also the competition's artistic director, hosted the Sanremo Music Festival for a third consecutive year in 2017. Conti was joined by Maria De Filippi, one of the most popular Italian TV celebrities and the presenter of several shows broadcast by Canale 5, the main private television network in Italy. Italian comedian Maurizio Crozza also had a minor role, performing political satire sketches during each show.

Voting
Voting during the five evenings occurred through different combinations of four methods:
 Public televoting, carried out via landline, mobile phone, the contest's official mobile app, and online voting.
 Press jury voting, expressed by accredited journalists that followed the competition from the Roof Hall at the Teatro Ariston.
 A poll, composed of a sample of 300 music fans, which voted from their homes via an electronic voting system managed by Ipsos.
 Expert jury voting, resulting from points assigned by personalities from the world of music, entertainment and culture. The jury was composed of Giorgio Moroder (president), Andrea Morricone, Giorgia Surina, Greta Menchi, Paolo Genovese, Rita Pavone, Violante Placido, Linus.
 During the final, the winner was determined via the combination of public televote (40%), expert jury (30%), and poll (30%).

Costs and incomes
The overall costs for the Sanremo Music Festival 2017 amounted to €16 million. 
Carlo Conti's compensation amounted to €650,000, while Maurizio Crozza received €120,000 for his performances. Maria De Filippi refused any compensation, and presented the festival for free.

In January 2017, RAI announced an expected income of more than €25.5 million, including €23 million from sponsorships.
Ticket prices to attend the Sanremo Music Festival 2017 at the Teatro Ariston ranged from €100 for a balcony seat, up to €672 for a ticket in the stalls area during the grand final.

Selections

Newcomers' section
The artists competing in the Newcomers' section were selected through two separate contests. Area Sanremo, organized by the comune of Sanremo, selected two entries of the main competition, while the remaining six artists where chosen through Sanremo Giovani, created by RAI.

Area Sanremo
Area Sanremo 2016 was a contest created by the comune of Sanremo. In August and September 2016, an itinerant series of lessons involving Italian music schools and cultural associations, named Area Sanremo Tour, was organized to encourage artists to compete in the contest. 412 songs entered Area Sanremo. In October 2016, a series of lessons about music and the music industry was offered to all competing artists. On 2 November 2016, competing artists were reduced to 70 acts, selected by a commission composed of Massimo Cotto, which also presided it, Stefano Senardi, also serving as the artistic director of the event, and Maurizio Caridi. 
Cotto, Senardi and Caridi, together with Antonio Vandoni and Andrea Mirò, also composed the commission which selected the 8 winners of the contest—Braschi, Andrea Corona, Marika Adele, Carlo Bolacchi, Carmen Alessandrello, Ylenia Lucisano, Valeria Farinacci and Diego Esposito—which were announced on 12 November 2016.
Finally, RAI chose two acts among the eight winners—Braschi and Valeria Farinacci—which were allowed to compete in the Newcomers' section of the Sanremo Music Festival 2017. The selected entries were announced by Carlo Conti on 12 December 2016, during the TV show Sarà Sanremo.

Sanremo Giovani
The contest organized by RAI to select six of the eight contestants of the Newcomers' section of the Sanremo Music Festival 2017 was named Sanremo Giovani. 560 acts entered the contest. On 21 October 2016, an internal commission reduced the number of competing artists to 60, eliminating the remaining ones. Following the rules of the contest, the winner of the singing contest Castrocaro Music Festival 2016—Ethan Lara—was also allowed to compete in the following phase of the competition as an additional entry. On 25 October 2016, the 61 selected acts auditioned in Rome. Following their performances, 12 artists, announced on 4 November 2016, were selected as the finalists of Sanremo Giovani.
The final of the contest was held during the TV show Sarà Sanremo on 12 December 2016. Artists performed their songs in 4 different groups. One artist for each group was eliminated. 

Group 1
 Carola Campagna – "Prima che arrivi il giorno" (eliminated)
 Marianne Mirage – "Le canzoni fanno male"
 Maldestro – "Canzone per Federica"
Group 2
 Chiara Grispo – "Niente è impossibile"
 La Rua – "Tutta la vita questa vita" (eliminated)
 Lele – "Ora mai"

Group 3
 Leonardo Lamacchia – "Ciò che resta"
 The Shalalalas – "Difficile" (eliminated)
 Valeria – "La vita è un'illusione"
Group 4
 Aprile & Mangiaracina – "Il cielo di Napoli" (eliminated)
 Tommaso Pini – "Cose che danno ansia"
 Francesco Guasti – "Universo"

Finally, among the 8 remaining artists, two were eliminated as a result of a new voting. In both phases, eliminations were decided by a jury, composed of Massimo Ranieri, Fabio Canino, Anna Foglietta, Amadeus and Andrea Delogu. Francesco Guasti, Lele, Leonardo Lamacchia, Maldestro, Marianne Mirage and Tommaso Pini were chosen as contestants of the Newcomers' section of the Sanremo Music Festival 2017.

Big Artists section
The artists competing in the Big Artists section were selected by an internal commission and announced by Carlo Conti on 12 December 2016, during the TV show Sarà Sanremo. According to the rules of the 2017 contest, competing artists should have been 20 but, on 6 December 2016, Carlo Conti decided to change the rules, increasing the number of entries to 22.

Competing entries

Shows

First evening

Tiziano Ferro opened the show with a tribute to Luigi Tenco, marking the 50th anniversary of his death: he sang "Mi sono innamorato di te". During the evening, Ferro also performed his recent hits "Potremmo ritornare" and "Il conforto", in a duet with Carmen Consoli. International guests on stage were the band Clean Bandit, with the song "Rockabye", and Ricky Martin, who performed a megamix composed of "Livin' la Vida Loca", "Shake Your Bon-Bon", "Vente Pa' Ca", "La Mordidita", "La Bomba", "María" and "The Cup of Life".

During the evening, there have been moments dedicated to: the fight against bullying within Italian public schools; the privacy on the web; the people affected by earthquakes that struck central Italy in recent months. For this reason are intervened: a delegation of Italian armed forces and Italian Red Cross; the founders of MaBasta association; actor Raoul Bova; sports journalist and TV presenter Diletta Leotta.

Maurizio Crozza performed a political satire sketch about Matteo Renzi, Matteo Salvini and Virginia Raggi. Other guests of this first evening were: comedians Paola Cortellesi and Antonio Albanese; actress Rocio Muñoz Morales; basketball player Marco Cusin and volleyball player Valentina Diouf.

Big Artists

Second evening
The second evening was opened by Japanese magician Hiroki Hara. The competition started with four out eight entries in the Newcomers' section. Then it was the turn of the other eleven entries of Big Artists section.

Three international guests of the evening were Robbie Williams, who performed "Love my life" and kissed Maria De Filippi on her lips; Biffy Clyro that have sung "Re-arrange"; and Canadian actor Keanu Reeves who has been interviewed by Maria De Filippi. Another singer on the stage was Giorgia, who performed her new single "Vanità" and a medley of her old hits "E poi", "Come saprei", "Di sole e d’azzurro".

During the course of the evening, Francesco Totti was interviewed by Carlo Conti and Maria De Filippi about his career and private life. Other guests of this evening were: the trio by Enrico Brignano, Gabriele Cirilli, Flavio Insinna; actress Sveva Alviti. Salvatore Nicotra was the special guests for "Tutti Cantano Sanremo". Maurizio Crozza dedicated his political satire sketch to the relationship between Italian State and woman rights.

Big Artists

Newcomers

Third evening
The third evening will feature sixteen acts competing in the Big Artists section performing cover versions of either Italian songs or international hit songs that have been translated into Italian. The competing acts had an option to perform their cover together with a guest artist. Also, the six songs that are at risk of elimination are performed, and voted on by means of the press room vote and televoting. The four remain songs of the Newcomers section are also performed and by a vote of the press room and the public through televoting and two are eliminated.

Big Artists – Cover Competition

Repechage

Newcomers

Fourth evening

In this evening all 20 songs remaining were performed again. The scores from the previous evenings are not counted for this evening. The last four songs in the combined votes of the televote (40%), poll (30%) and the expert jury (30%) were eliminated. Also, the winner of the 4 remaining songs in the Newcomers section was determined.

Big Artists

Newcomers

Fifth evening

On the final evening all 16 remaining songs in the Big Artists section were performed and a winner was determined.

Big Artists – Final – First Round

Big Artists – Final – Second Round

Special guests
The special guests of Sanremo Music Festival 2017 were:

 Singers / musicians: Anne-Marie, Alvaro Soler, Beppe Vessicchio, Carmen Consoli, Davide Rossi, Giorgia, Karen Harding, LP, Mika, Mina, Peppe Vessicchio, Rag'n'Bone Man, Ricky Martin, Robbie Williams, Robin Schulz, Tiziano Ferro, Zucchero Fornaciari.
 Bands / music groups: Clean Bandit, Biffy Clyro, Ladri di carrozzelle, Recycled Orchestra of Cateura (Paraguay), Piccolo Coro dell'Antoniano.
 Actors / comedians / models : Alessandra Mastronardi, Alessandro Gassman, Antonio Albanese, Diana del Bufalo, Flavio Insinna, Gabriele Cirilli, Geppi Cucciari, Giusy Buscemi, Keanu Reeves, Luca Bizzarri, Luca Zingaretti, Marco Giallini, Paola Cortellesi, Paolo Kessisoglu, Raoul Bova, Rocio Muñoz Morales, Virginia Raffaele, Ubaldo Pantani.
 Athletes: Francesco Totti, Marco Cusin, Valentina Diouf.
 Other notable figures: Antonella Clerici, Diletta Leotta, Kitonb, Gaetano Moscato, Hiroki Hara, Maria Pollacci, Stev Otten.

Related shows

Prima Festival
Federico Russo, Tess Masazza, Herbert Ballerina present Prima Festival 2017, a small show on air on Rai 1 immediately after TG1. The show features details, curiosities and news relating to Sanremo Music Festival 2017.

Dopo Festival
Nicola Savino, Gialappa's Band and Ubaldo Pantani are the presenters of Dopo Festival 2017, a talk show on air on Rai 1 immediately after Sanremo Music Festival. The show features comments about the televised song contest with the participation of singers and journalists.

Broadcast and ratings

Local broadcast
Rai 1, Rai 4, Rai Radio 1 and Rai Radio 2 are the official broadcasters of the festival in Italy. The show is also available in streaming on the Rai Play website.

Ratings Sanremo Music Festival 2017
The audience is referred to the one of Rai 1.

Ratings Prima Festival 2017

Ratings Dopo Festival 2017

International broadcast
The international television service Rai Italia broadcast the competition in the Americas, Africa, Asia and Australia.

References

External links

2017 in Italian music
2017 in Italian television
2017 song contests
February 2017 events in Italy
Sanremo Music Festival by year